Evdokia Gretchichnikova (born 9 December 1982) is a Russian modern pentathlete. At the 2008 Summer Olympics, she finished in 25th. At the 2012 Summer Olympics, she competed in the women's competition, finishing in 35th place.

References

External links
 

Russian female modern pentathletes
1982 births
Living people
Olympic modern pentathletes of Russia
Modern pentathletes at the 2008 Summer Olympics
Modern pentathletes at the 2012 Summer Olympics
World Modern Pentathlon Championships medalists
Sportspeople from Ufa
21st-century Russian women